Risa Takenaka (born January 6, 1990) is a Japanese long-distance runner who competes in marathon races.

Takenaka was part of the winning team at the 2010 International Chiba Ekiden.

Takenaka won the 2015 Gold Coast Marathon, defeating Keiko Nogami and Manami Kamitanida.

References

External links

Living people
Japanese female long-distance runners
Japanese female marathon runners
1990 births
20th-century Japanese women
21st-century Japanese women